Ercheia is a genus of moths in the family Erebidae. The genus was erected by Francis Walker in 1858.

Description
Palpi upturned, where the second joint reaching vertex of head and third joint long in both sexes. Antennae minutely ciliated in male. Thorax and abdomen smoothly scaled. Mid and hind tibia spined, whereas fore tibia of male clothed with long hair. Forewings with somewhat rounded apex and crenulate cilia in both wings.

Species

 Ercheia amoena L. B. Prout, 1919
 Ercheia bergeri Viette, 1968
 Ercheia careona Swinhoe, 1918
 Ercheia chionoptera Druce, 1912
 Ercheia cyllaria (Cramer, 1779)
 Ercheia designata (Warren, 1914)
 Ercheia dipterygia Hampson, 1913
 Ercheia diversipennis Walker, [1858] (syn: Ercheia ambidens (Felder and Rogenhofer, 1874), Ercheia zygia Swinhoe, 1885)
 Ercheia dubia Butler, 1874
 Ercheia ekeikei Bethune-Baker, 1906
 Ercheia enganica Swinhoe, 1918
 Ercheia kebea Bethune-Baker, 1906
 Ercheia latistria L. B. Prout, 1919
 Ercheia mahagonica (Saalmüller, 1891)
 Ercheia multilinea Swinhoe, 1902
 Ercheia niveostrigata Warren, 1913
 Ercheia pulchrivenula Gaede, 1938
 Ercheia pulchrivena (Walker, 1864)
 Ercheia quadriplaga (Walker, 1865)
 Ercheia scotobathra A. E. Prout, 1926
 Ercheia styx Bethune-Baker, 1906
 Ercheia subsignata (Walker, 1865) (syn: Ercheia periploca Holland, 1894)
 Ercheia umbrosa Butler, 1881
 Ercheia zura Swinhoe, 1885

Former species
 Ercheia albirenata Gaede, 1917
 Ercheia anvira Swinhoe, 1918
 Ercheia spilophracta Turner, 1933 (Facidina)

References

External links
 
 

Ercheiini
Moth genera